Parley Edward Baer (August 5, 1914 – November 22, 2002) was an American actor in radio and later in television and film. Despite dozens of appearances in television series and theatrical films, he remains best known as the original "Chester" in the radio version of Gunsmoke, and as the Mayor of Mayberry (Roy Stoner) in The Andy Griffith Show.

Early life, family and education

Parley Edward Baer was born in Salt Lake City, Utah. He studied drama at the University of Utah.

Career
Baer had a circus background, but he began his radio career at Utah station KSL.

Circus
Early in his career, Baer was a circus ringmaster and publicist. He left those roles for military service in World War II. In the 1950s, he had a job training wild animals at Jungleland USA in Thousand Oaks, California. Still later, he served as a docent at the Los Angeles Zoo.

Military
Baer was commissioned as an officer in the United States Army Air Forces during World War II, attaining the rank of Captain. He served from 1942 to 1946 in the Pacific Theater, earning an Army Presidential Unit Citation, the American Campaign Medal, the Asiatic–Pacific Campaign Medal, the World War II Victory Medal and seven service stars.

Radio
Baer in the 1930s served on radio as director of special events for KSL. His first network show was The Whistler, which was soon followed by appearances on Escape (notably narrating "Wild Jack Rhett" and as the title patriot in an adaptation of Stephen Vincent Benet's "A Tooth for Paul Revere"), Suspense, Tales of the Texas Rangers (as various local sheriffs), Dragnet, The CBS Radio Workshop, Lux Radio Theater, The Six Shooter, and Yours Truly, Johnny Dollar, to name a few.

In 1952, he began playing Chester, the trusty jailhouse assistant to Marshal Matt Dillon on the radio version of Gunsmoke, eventually ad-libbing the character's full name, "Chester Wesley Proudfoot" (later changed to "Chester Goode" in the televised version of the series, which featured Dennis Weaver in the role of Chester). Baer also worked as a voice actor on several other radio shows produced by Norman MacDonnell, performing as Pete the Marshal on the situation comedy The Harold Peary Show, as Doc Clemens on Rogers of the Gazette, and as additional characters on Fort Laramie and The Adventures of Philip Marlowe.

Other recurring roles included Eb the farm hand on Granby's Green Acres (the radio predecessor to television's Green Acres), Gramps on The Truitts, and Rene the manservant on a radio version of The Count of Monte Cristo. His later radio work included playing  Reginald Duffield and Uncle Joe Finneman on the Focus on the Family series Adventures in Odyssey in the 1980s and 1990s.

Radio playwright and director Norman Corwin cast Baer as Simon Legree in the 1969 KCET television reading of his 1938 radio play The Plot to Overthrow Christmas.

Films and television
As an on-camera performer, Baer was recognizable by his distinctive voice, his paunchy appearance, and his balding head.  Often he portrayed fussy, bossy, and/or obstinate officials or neighbors. Extended television roles included blustering, by-the-book Mayor Stoner on The Andy Griffith Show, the neighbor Darby on The Adventures of Ozzie and Harriet, frequent guest appearances on The Addams Family as insurance man and city commissioner Arthur J. Henson, and in the late 1990s, Miles Dugan on The Young and the Restless.  He also appeared as a telephone executive on Gomer Pyle, U.S.M.C.

Baer guest-starred in the 1950s on NBC's The Dennis Day Show and It's a Great Life, on CBS's Hey, Jeannie!, on ABC's The Law and Mr. Jones with James Whitmore, on the syndicated crime drama Johnny Midnight with Edmond O'Brien, and on the NBC children's western series, Fury with Peter Graves and Bobby Diamond. He made six guest appearances on Perry Mason during the last five seasons of the CBS legal drama, including the role of Edward Farraday in the 1962 episode, "The Case of the Captain's Coins," and Willard Hupp in the 1963 episode, "The Case of the Bouncing Boomerang".

He also appeared on the ABC sitcom Harrigan and Son, on the ABC/Warner Bros. crime drama, The Roaring 20s, on NBC's crime drama Dan Raven starring Skip Homeier, and on the NBC family drama, National Velvet. Baer was cast twice on Walter Brennan's sitcom, The Real McCoys. He also guest-starred on the  CBS sitcoms Dennis the Menace with Jay North, The Tom Ewell Show with Tom Ewell, and Angel, starring Annie Fargé. In the latter, he carried the lead as Dr. Mathews in the single episode "The Dentist", with Maudie Prickett as his dental secretary.

In 1961, Baer guest-starred on Marilyn Maxwell's short-lived ABC drama series, Bus Stop. On April 13, 1962, he appeared, along with Frank Ferguson and Royal Dano in ABC's crime drama Target: The Corruptors in the episode "Journey into Mourning".  He was cast as hotel owner Mr. Kringelein in the 1962 film, Gypsy, opposite Natalie Wood and Rosalind Russell.
 
In 1963, Baer appeared with Charles Aidman and Karl Swenson in the three-part episode "Security Risk", a story of international blackmail and intrigue, on the CBS anthology series, GE True, hosted by Jack Webb.

In 1964, Baer was cast as a sheriff in an episode of Mickey Rooney's short-lived Mickey sitcom, and as a scientist in an Outer Limits episode, "Behold, Eck!"  He was seen in four episodes of Hogan's Heroes and eight episodes of Bewitched in various roles as advertising clients of McMann and Tate.

Baer was cast as Horace Greeley, who came to Colorado in 1859 in the Pikes Peak Gold Rush, in the 1965 episode "The Great Turkey War" of the syndicated series, Death Valley Days.

In 1967, Baer appeared as General Whitfield on the I Dream of Jeannie episode, "Fly Me to the Moon".

Baer made two appearances on Petticoat Junction.  In the 1966 episode, "Jury at the Shady Rest", he was Bailiff Tucker.   Then, in the 1969 episode, "The Glen Tinker Caper", he was Judge Madison.

Later guest appearances included Three for the Road, Three's Company (as a cooking competition judge), The San Pedro Beach Bums, The A-Team, Star Trek: Voyager, The Fresh Prince of Bel-Air, The Dukes of Hazzard, Night Court, Newhart, Little House on the Prairie, The Golden Girls, Hazel, and Mad About You.  He also played the role of the minister who married J. R. and Sue Ellen Ewing for their second marriage on Dallas.  He also made guest appearances on F Troop.

Baer's film roles included parts in several live-action Disney features, including Follow Me, Boys! (again as a mayor), The Ugly Dachshund,  and Those Calloways. He also appeared in Two on a Guillotine and Dave (as the Senate majority leader). Baer had a featured role in the 1958 war drama The Young Lions, portraying a German officer and friend of Marlon Brando.

Baer was especially proud of his brief appearance in the film, White Dog, a powerful story about racism. Baer plays a character seen at first as a kindly grandfather, only to reveal himself as a hateful bigot who has trained the title character to attack black skin.  Baer remarked, "Often racism, like true evil, presents itself with a smile and a handshake".

Some 10 years earlier, Baer played a closet racist in a Christmas episode of Bewitched. The episode "Sisters at Heart" aired on ABC on December 24, 1970, in which he played the role of Mr. Brockway, the owner of a toy-manufacturing firm.

Commercials
Baer voiced Ernie Keebler in the cookie commercials before he suffered a stroke in 1997 which affected both speech and movement. He recovered sufficiently to make a handful of appearances at old-time radio conventions in his later years. In the 1980s he dressed in old-time garb as "Mr. S", one of the company founders, in commercials for S&W Fine Foods.

Personal life and death
In 1946, Baer met and married circus aerialist and bareback rider Ernestine Clarke. They were together for 54 years until her death on August 5, 2000, in Tarzana, California.

Baer was a long-term member of St. Nicholas Episcopal Church in Encino, California, where he served in many capacities, including head usher.

In 1969, Baer gave the eulogy at the funeral of The Andy Griffith Show castmate Howard McNear.  McNear had portrayed Mayberry's Floyd the Barber and Baer had played Mayor Roy Stoner. McNear also portrayed Doc Adams in the radio version of Gunsmoke, often interacting with Baer's character, Chester Proudfoot.

On November 11, 2002, following another stroke, Baer was taken to the Motion Picture & Television Country House and Hospital. Eleven days later, at the age of 88, he died there.

Filmography

 The Kid from Texas (1950) as Off-Screen Narrator (voice, uncredited)
 Comanche Territory (1950) as Boozer, the Bartender
 Union Station (1950) as Detective Gottschalk
 The Company She Keeps (1951) as Steve (uncredited)
 Three Guys Named Mike (1951) as Bakery Truck Driver (uncredited)
 Air Cadet (1951) as Major Jim Evans
 The Fat Man (1951) as Police Detective O'Halloran (uncredited)
 The Frogmen (1951) as Dr. Ullman (uncredited)
 People Will Talk (1951) as Toy Store Salesman (uncredited)
 Elopement (1952) as Dr. Henry (uncredited)
 Red Skies of Montana (1952) as Dr. Henry (uncredited)
 The Dennis Day Show (1952, TV Series) 
 Deadline – U.S.A. (1952) as Headwaiter (uncredited)
 Fearless Fagan (1952) as Emil Tauchnitz
 Something for the Birds (1952) as Refrigerator Deliveryman (uncredited)
 Dragnet (1952, TV Series) as Father on Phone / District Attorney
 Pickup on South Street (1953) as Headquarters Communist in Chair (uncredited)
 Vicki (1953) as 2nd Detective (uncredited)
 The Gambler from Natchez (1954) as Riverboat Captain (uncredited)
 The George Burns and Gracie Allen Show (1954, TV Series) as Detective Sharkey
 The Loretta Young Show (1954, TV Series) as Mr. Banner
 Father Knows Best (1955, TV Series) as Lyle
 The Bob Cummings Show (1955, TV Series) as Wester
 Our Miss Brooks (1952-1955, TV Series) as Mr Maynard / Mr Chambers / Bennett
 Alfred Hitchcock Presents (1956, TV Series) as Police Detective Gryar
 D-Day the Sixth of June (1956) as Sgt. Gerbert (uncredited)
 Away All Boats (1956) as Dr. Gates
 December Bride (1956, TV Series)
 Drango (1957) as George Randolph
 I Love Lucy (1955-1957, TV Series) as Mr. Perry / Mr. Reilly
 Jane Wyman Presents The Fireside Theatre (1956-1957, TV Series) as Enos Finney / Mr. Fitch / Fitch
 Official Detective (1958, TV Series) as Sam Goodwin
 The Young Lions (1958) as Sergeant Brandt
 Paul Bunyan (1958) as Chris Crosshaul
 The FBI Story (1959) as Harry Dakins
 Westinghouse Desilu Playhouse (1959, TV Series) as Gaunt
 Zane Grey Theater (1956-1959, TV Series) as Frank Lloyd / Clem Doud / Mayor Homer Bellam / Dan Morriss
 Cash McCall (1960) as Harvey Bannon
 Wake Me When It's Over (1960) as Col. Archie Hollingsworth
 The Adventures of Huckleberry Finn (1960) as Grangeford Man
 Make Room for Daddy (1956-1960, TV Series) as Mr. Denton, Postal Inspector / Mr. Kendall / Mr. Haynes
 The Real McCoys (1958-1960, TV Series) as Mr. Venable / Mr. Saunders
 The Rifleman (1959-1961, TV Series) as Neff Packer / Walter Mathers
 Dennis the Menace (1959-1962, TV Series) as Mr. Pindyck / Capt. Blast
 The Tom Ewell Show (1960, TV Series) as Mayor Bradford
 A Fever in the Blood (1961) as Charles 'Charlie' Bosworth
 The Dick Powell Theatre (1962, TV Series) as Lt. Hockberg
 General Electric Theater (1954-1962, TV Series) as Harvey Seymour / Mayor Douglas / Haveman
 Bachelor Father (1962, TV Series) as Dr. Whittaker
 The Spiral Road (1962) as Mr. Boosmans
 Have Gun - Will Travel (1959-1962, TV Series) as Reston - Townsman / Sam Thurber / John Ellsworth (ironically playing a  character whose death was connected to a traveling circus schedule)
 Laramie (1962, TV Series) as Fred McAllen
 Gypsy (1962) as Mr. Kringelein
 The Andy Griffith Show (1962-1963, TV Series) as Mayor Roy Stoner
 Rawhide (1963, TV Series) as Bryant / Dinny
 Dr. Kildare (1963, TV Series) as Dr. James Connors
 Wagon Train (1962-1963, TV Series) as George Talley / John Maitland / Clyde Montgomery
 77 Sunset Strip (1964, TV Series) as Charlie Cornwall
 The Jack Benny Program (1964, TV Series) as Charlie Cornwall
 The Brass Bottle (1964) as Samuel Wackerbath
 Bedtime Story (1964) as Col. Williams
 The Outer Limits (1964, TV Series) as Dr. Bernard Stone
 Bob Hope Presents the Chrysler Theatre (1964, TV Series) as Leonard F. Bellack
 The Joey Bishop Show (1964, TV Series) as Judge
 Two on a Guillotine (1965) as 'Buzz' Sheridan
 Those Calloways (1965) as Doane Shattuck
 Hazel (1965, TV Series) as Mr. Rowland
 Bus Riley's Back in Town (1965) as Jules Griswald
 Fluffy (1965) as Police Captain
 The Money Trap (1965) as Banker (scenes deleted)
 Marriage on the Rocks (1965) as Dr. Newman (uncredited)
 My Favorite Martian (1965, TV Series) as Mr. Babcock
 Death Valley Days (1963-1965, TV Series) as Horace Greeley / Sager / Dr. Simon / Crowder
 The Adventures of Ozzie & Harriet (TV Series) (1953-1965, TV Series) as Herb Darby / Attorney Hopkins
 F Troop (1965, TV Series) as Colonel Watkins
 Burke's Law (1965, TV Series) as Colonel Pavlov Popoff
 The Farmer's Daughter (1965-1966, TV Series) as Mr. Rapp / Otto Olsen
 The Ugly Dachshund (1966) as Mel Chadwick
 Bonanza (1961-1966, TV Series) as Harry Crawford / Frank Armstead / Jack Cunningham
 The Addams Family (1965-1966, TV Series) as Mayor Arthur J. Henson
 Perry Mason (1961-1966, TV Series) as Frank Cummings / Ian Jarvis / Willard Hupp / David Bickel / Edward Farraday / Seward Quentin
 Follow Me, Boys! (1966) as Mayor
 The Fugitive (1964-1967, TV Series) as Al Cooney / Lee Burroughs
 The Adventures of Bullwhip Griffin (1967) as Chief Executioner
 The Phyllis Diller Show (1966-1967, TV Series) as Morgan / Derwin
 Rango (1967, TV Series) as Wilkins
 Laredo (1967, TV Series) as Alcott Willingham
 The Gnome-Mobile (1967) as The Owl (voice, uncredited)
 I Dream of Jeannie (1967, TV Series) as General Whiston
 Gomer Pyle, U.S.M.C. (1966-1967, TV Series) as Judson Travers / Mr. Corbett
 The Lucy Show (1962-1967, TV Series) as Dr. Davis / Colonel Dietrich / Judge / Mr. Evans
 Lassie (1968, TV Series) as Austin Redmond / Austin Richmond
 Day of the Evil Gun (1968) as Willford
 Counterpoint (1968) as Hook
 Judd for the Defense (1968, TV Series) as Magistrate
 Where Were You When the Lights Went Out? (1968) as Dr. Dudley Caldwell
 Ironside (1968, TV Series) as Everett Brandt / Commander Stevens
 The Name of the Game (1969, TV Series) as Doctor
 Land of the Giants (1969, TV Series) as Senator Obek
 Young Billy Young (1969) as Bell
 The Doris Day Show (1969, TV Series) as Mr. Thornby
 Hogan's Heroes (1965-1969, TV Series) as Julius Schlager / Doctor Pohlmann / Colonel Burmeister / Professor Altman
 Mannix (1970, TV Series) as Archie
 Petticoat Junction (1965-1970, TV Series) as Mr. Bellingham / Judge Madison / Judge Turner / Bailiff Vince Tucker / Henry Phillips
 The F.B.I. (1965-1970, TV Series) as Newman / Vernon Daniels / Jake Jason
 The Bill Cosby Show (1970, TV Series) as Mr. Tyler
 The Virginian (1962-1970, TV Series) as Henderson / Judge Jeremiah Pitt / Pat Magill / The Senator
 Green Acres (1965-1971, TV Series) as Lt. Governor / Mister Peterson / Mr. Treffinger / Mr. Webster
 Skin Game (1971) as Mr. Claggart
 Mod Squad (1971, TV Series) as Koger
 Walt Disney's Wonderful World of Color (1959-1971, TV Series) as Mayor Hancock
 Here's Lucy (1971, TV Series) as Dr. Cunningham
 Bewitched (1966-1972, TV Series) as Walter Franklin / Mr. Burkeholder / Mr. Brockway / Desk Sergeant / Mr. Nickerson / Bigelow / Dr. Matthew Kramer / James Dennis Robinson
 Medical Center (1971-1973, TV Series) as Farraday / Dr. Fred Elter
 Kung Fu (1973, TV Series) as Dr. Gormley
 Sixteen (1973) as The Reverend
 The Streets of San Francisco (1976, TV Series) as Jack Leopold
 The Amazing Dobermans (1976) as Septimus, Circus Owner
 The Hardy Boys/Nancy Drew Mysteries (1977, TV Series) as Doc Wilson
 Charlie's Angels (1978-1979, TV Series) as Grandpa / Captain Jack McGuire
 The Incredible Hulk (1979, TV Series) as Raymond Harmell 
 B.J. and the Bear (1980, TV Series) as Mayor
 Little House on the Prairie (1976-1980, TV Series) as Mr. Williams / J.W. Diamond
 WKRP in Cincinnati (1980, TV Series) as Mr. Armor
 Knots Landing (1981, TV Series) as Old Man
 Carbon Copy (1981) as Dr. Bristol
 Hart to Hart (1982, TV Series) as Constantine Wainwright
 Lou Grant (1979-1982, TV Series) as Ray Elders / Carlton Stiefel / Haggerty / Sheriff Burkhardt
 White Dog (1982) as Wilber Hull
 Father Murphy (1982, TV Series) as Banker
 Dallas (1982, TV Series) as Minister Brown
 Archie Bunker's Place (1983, TV Series) as Judge Anthony Barzini
 Doctor Detroit (1983) as Judge
 Three's Company (1983, TV Series) as Bert Landers
 The A-Team (1984, TV Series) as Max Klein
 Chattanooga Choo Choo (1984) as Alonzo Dillard
 The Dukes of Hazzard (1981-1984, TV Series) as Doc Appleby
 Pray for Death (1985) as Sam Green
 Simon & Simon (1986, TV Series) as Tourist Husband
 Flag (1986)
 Newhart (1984-1987, TV Series) as Buck
 The Golden Girls (1987, TV Series) as Chester T. Rainey
 Night Court (1988, TV Series) as Judge Sims
 License to Drive (1988) as Grandpa Anderson
 Time Trackers (1989) as Lucius
 Growing Pains (1989, TV Series) as Counterman
 Almost an Angel (1990) as George Bealeman
 Beverly Hills, 90210 (1991, TV Series) as Al Brown
 Quantum Leap (1991-1992, TV Series) as Judge Shiner / Dr. Rogers
 Space Case (1992) as Bitby
 Mad About You (1993, TV Series) as The Husband
 The Fresh Prince of Bel-Air (1993, TV Series) as Woodrow
 Dave (1993) as Senate Majority Leader
 King B: A Life in the Movies (1993) as Walter Dent
 The Young and the Restless (1993-1996, TV Series) as Miles Dugan
 L.A. Law (1990-1994, TV Series) as Supreme Court Judge Parker
 Roswell (1994) as Civilian Advisor
 Renegade (1994) as Wesley 
 Last of the Dogmen (1995) as Mr. Hollis
 Coach (1995, TV Series) as Frank
 Star Trek: Voyager (1996, TV Series) as Old Man #1
 Man and Cat (2001) as Cat (final film role)

Listen to
 Interview with Parley Baer (following Dick Tracy episode)

References

Bibliography

External links

 
 

 

1914 births
2002 deaths
American male film actors
American male radio actors
American male television actors
American male voice actors
United States Army Air Forces personnel of World War II
Burials at Forest Lawn Memorial Park (Hollywood Hills)
20th-century American male actors
Male actors from Salt Lake City
Male actors from Utah
20th-century American Episcopalians